Volto Nascosto (Italian: "Hidden Face") is the title of an Italian short comic series written by Gianfranco Manfredi for Sergio Bonelli Editore. The first issue was published on 10 October 2007.

The miniseries is made up of 14 issues, meant to form a single, long graphic novel, as Manfredi already did with Magico Vento.

Among the artists working at the series there are Goran Parlov (the characters' graphic creator and first issue's artist), Massimo Rotundo (also the covers' author), Giuseppe Matteoni, Ersin Burak (a Turkish artist at his first experience with Bonelli), Roberto Diso, Giovanni Freghieri, Alessandro Nespolino, Leomacs and Gigi Simeoni.

Plot 
The story is set up towards the end of the nineteenth century and takes place among Rome, Ethiopia (the only African country that, in this period, resisted European imperialism) and Eritrea, Italian colonies in Africa.

The main character is "Volto Nascosto", a mysterious Islamic warrior and prophet whose face is covered with a silver mask and who, in the story, leads the resistance of Ethiopian people against foreign invaders. (His figure was based on real Islamic legends.) However, the series doesn't only revolve around Volto Nascosto, but deals with various characters, whose events continuously intertwine with each other. This multiplicity of voices is a rather innovative aspect for Bonelli's publishing house.

The characters playing around Volto Nascosto are:
 Ugo Pastore, an honest and loyal young man, skilful in the use of a pistol. After changing several jobs, he adapts himself to an accountant's role at a notary's office;
 Enea Pastore, Ugo's father and the owner of the Caput Mundi firm;
 Menelik II (a real historical figure), the King of Ethiopia and Taytu's husband;
 Taytu (a real historical figure), the Queen of Ethiopia and Menelik's wife;
 Vittorio De Cesari, Ugo's best friend, a cavalry lieutenant from a noble family, fond of adventure and beautiful women;
 Matilde Sereni, a Roman girl from a wealthy family, the victim of a nervous illness. Ugo is in love with her, but she loves Vittorio (who, however, doesn't return her feelings).

As it is clear from this short description, the series has a strong literary inspiration and deliberately merges elements from different genres, from classic adventure to historical novel and nineteenth century feuilleton. This last aspect is particularly evident not only in the choice of the serial formula, but also in the presence of some typical situations: the love triangle, the sensitive girl with a mysterious past, etc., which directly recall the topoi of the nineteenth century novels and operas.

Another interesting feature about the story is the setting in the late nineteenth century Italy, a not very well known period of Italian history and an unusual choice for a comic-book series.

The issues 
Volto Nascosto's adventures are published monthly, in the usual format of Sergio Bonelli's comic-books (paperbacks 16x21 cm (6.3x8.3 in), with 96 pages).

The series is made up of the following issues:

See also
 First Italo-Ethiopian War

Notes

Further reading

External links 
 Volto Nascosto Official Webpage 
 Volto Nascosto Official Webpage 
 Volto Nascosto File at UBCfumetti.com 
 Volto Nascosto File, from Gianfranco Manfredi Official Site 
 L'Africa a fumetti. Video at Repubblica.it dedicated to Volto Nascosto, with an interview to Gianfranco Manfredi 

Italian comics titles